Nông Văn Vân (農文雲, ?–1835) was the leader of a peasant revolt in Vietnam from 1833–1835. Although the revolt is often seen as Nùng tribal separatism, historian Nguyễn Phan Quang argues that the revolt had national aspirations.

References

19th-century Vietnamese people
1835 deaths
Year of birth missing
Vietnamese rebels
Nùng people